A head tie also known as a headwrap is a women's cloth head scarf that is commonly worn in many parts of West Africa and Southern Africa. The head tie is used as an ornamental head covering or fashion accessory, or for functionality in different settings. Its use or meaning can vary depending on the country and/or religion of those who wear it. Among Jewish women, the Biblical source for covering hair comes from the Torah in the book of Bamidbar Parshas Nasso which contains the source for the obligation of a married woman to cover her hair. An eesha sotah is a woman whose husband suspects her of having acted immorally. The Torah commands the Kohein to take various steps to demonstrate that the sotah has deviated from the modest and loyal path of most married Jewish women (Rashi 5:15-27). Among the procedures, the pasuk clearly states: “ufora es rosh haisha…” and he shall uncover the hair of the head of the woman (5:18). One can only uncover something that has previously been covered; in this case the Torah is referring to the married woman’s hair.

There are varying traditional names for headties in different countries, which include: gele (Nigeria), duku (Malawi, Ghana), dhuku (Zimbabwe), tukwi (Botswana), doek (South Africa, Namibia) and tignon (United States) Jewish women refer to their head ties as a tichel or mitpachat.

West Africa
In Nigeria, the head-ties are known as gele (a Yoruba-language word and attire), and can be rather large and elaborate. Although the gele can be worn for day-to-day activities, the elaborate ceremonial ones are worn to weddings, special events, and church activities. It is usually made of a material that is firmer than regular cloth. When worn, especially for more elaborate events, the gele typically covers a woman's entire hair as well as her ears. The only part exposed is her face and earrings on the lower part of her earlobes. The gele is accompanied by traditional local attire that may or may not have the same pattern as the headtie itself.

In Ghana, opportunity to wear a duku usually falls on a religious day of Friday, Saturday or Sunday. This depends on whether the wearers are Muslim, Seventh-Day Adventists or Sunday church-going Christians.

Southern Africa
In South Africa and Namibia, the Afrikaans word doek (meaning "cloth") is used for the traditional head covering used among most elderly local women in rural areas. Malawian head-ties are usually small and conservative compared to the Nigerian style.  Women wear duku at special events like funerals. Urban women with plaited hair also wear a duku when visiting rural areas out of cultural respect. In addition, women may wear duku during sleep to protect the hair.

In South African church services women may wear white "dukus" to cover their heads. At the International Pentecostal churches in South Africa, married women wear white 'dukus'.

The Shangaan women in Zimbabwe and South Africa wear 'dukus' as fashion accessories. At other social gatherings in Zimbabwe women may wear a dhuku.

According to Professor Hlonipha Mokoena of the Witwatersrand Institute for Social and Economic Research, historically the doek or headscarf was imposed on black women in many colonies by convention or by law as a way to control the sensuality and exoticism that “confused” white men. 2016 saw a resurgence of wearing doeks through the #FeesMustFall movement among students around South Africa.

See also
Headscarf
Hijab
Tignon

References

External links
 
 
 
 
 
  

Headgear
Islamic female clothing
Scarves
Turbans
Nigerian clothing